The 2017–18 SV Wehen Wiesbaden season is the 92nd season in the football club's history. The season covers a period from 1 July 2017 to 30 June 2018.

Players

Squad information

Competitions

3. Liga

League table

Results summary

Results by round

Matches

DFB-Pokal

Hessian Cup

References

SV Wehen Wiesbaden seasons
Wiesbaden